Lady Liberty Hong Kong was a  statue that was created during the 2019–2020 Hong Kong protests, designed by users from the LIHKG forum. 
Created in August 2019, the statue was publicly displayed in multiple locations before being hauled to the top of Lion Rock, intended as the statue's "final resting place"; however, the statue was vandalised and removed by unknown assailants the next day.

Inception 
In August 2019, a design team came up with nine design proposals for the statue. An online vote was held on LIHKG, leading the team to select the "Goddess of democracy" design, which was modelled after a female demonstrator whose eye was allegedly ruptured by a bean bag round shot by the police. Roughly  was spent on the statue, and the remaining  was donated to the 612 Humanitarian Relief Fund in support of the protest movement.

The team involved in the production included:

 Core team of 15 people, 5 people
 Graphic design team, 30 people
 3D design team, 10 people
 3D printing team, 30 people
 Metal structure team, 10 people
 Sculpture production team, 25 people
 Counter-powered driver, 5 people
 Transportation and site assembly team of 20 people
 8,000 netizens who participated in the draft design vote

Design concept
The design concept of Lady Liberty Hong Kong was inspired by a typical demonstrator's outfit: a yellow helmet, eye mask and a gas mask; the right hand holds an umbrella, while the left hand holds a banner with the slogan "Liberate Hong Kong, Revolution of our times", a commonly used slogan in the protest movement. The team has stated the statue symbolised "the unparalleled bravery of Hongkongers in voicing out amidst [the] rain of bullets and tear gas in the prolonged anti-extradition bill movement".

Exhibition
The statue was first publicly displayed at the Chinese University of Hong Kong on 31 August. The statue was also displayed at the "Anti-Abusive and Anti-authoritarian Rally" held at Chater Garden on 6 September and was temporarily moved to the University of Hong Kong afterwards. On 13 October, the statue was hauled to the top of Lion Rock by a team of 32 volunteers, including 16 professional climbers. The organisers had intended Lion Rock as the statue's "final resting place", as "a symbolic gesture to infuse a refreshed mindset for the fight for democracy." However, on the next morning, the statue was toppled and vandalised with red paint by unknown assailants.

See also

 Goddess of Democracy, similar statue created during the 1989 Tiananmen Square protests
 Hong Kong's Statue of Democracy, a replica unveiled in 2008 to commemorate the 1989 protests

References

External links
3D printing files for the Hong Kong Statue of Democracy

2019–2020 Hong Kong protests
2019 sculptures
Liberty symbols
Statues in Hong Kong
Vandalized works of art